The Embassy of France in Bamako is the diplomatic mission of France to Mali. It is in Patrice Lumumba Square in Bamako, the capital of Mali. , the French ambassador to Mali was Gilles Huberson.

External links
 Official website

France
Mali
France–Mali relations